The Pesa is a river in Tuscany, central Italy. It has a length of 53 km, and, after crossing the provinces of Siena and Florence, flows into the Arno River near Montelupo Fiorentino.

Rivers of Tuscany
Rivers of the Province of Florence
Rivers of the Province of Siena
Rivers of Italy